22 Boötis is a single star in the northern constellation of Boötes, located 319 light years away from the Sun. It has the Bayer designation f Boötis; 22 Boötis is the Flamsteed designation. This object is visible to the naked eye as a dim, white-hued star with an apparent visual magnitude of 5.40. It is moving closer to the Earth with a heliocentric radial velocity of −27 km/s.

This is an Am star with a stellar classification of kA7 hA8 mF2 (III) ((Sr II)), showing the calcium K line of an A7 star, the hydrogen lines of an A8 star, and the metal lines of an F2 star. It has the luminosity class of a giant star and does not appear to be variable. The star has twice the mass of the Sun and four times the Sun's radius. It is spinning with a projected rotational velocity of 38 km/s. 22 Boötis is radiating 52 times the Sun's luminosity from its photosphere at an effective temperature of 7,528 K.

References

External links
 HR 5405
 Image 22 Boötis

F-type giants
Am stars
Boötes
Bootis, f
Durchmusterung objects
Bootis, 22
126661
070602
5405
A-type giants